Southlands School is an independent specialist school and children's home, located in the parish of Boldre, near Lymington, Hampshire, England. On 13 May 1987 it became a grade II listed building.

In 1995, Southlands established itself as the first residential specialist school in the United Kingdom for students with a diagnosis of Asperger syndrome. In 2014, after expanding its residential provisions, Southlands registered as a children's home.

Controversies 
In September 2019, the school was examined by the Independent Inquiry into Child Sexual Abuse; the school's children's home was later judged as 'Inadequate' by Ofsted.

In July 2022, an English teacher at the school was banned from teaching indefinitely after she was accused of failing to maintain professional boundaries. The teacher had asked to be alone with a pupil and had contacted the pupils mother under the pseudonym Tom Jones.

References

Private schools in Hampshire
Schools for people on the autistic spectrum
Special schools in Hampshire
1995 establishments in England
Grade II listed buildings in Hampshire
New Forest